Brian Medavoy (born June 30, 1965) is an American talent manager, entrepreneur and television producer. He is the son of film producer and executive, Mike Medavoy.

Career
Medavoy began his career in 1985 in the mail room at the Creative Artists Agency.  He then moved to ICM Partners' mail room and eventually became the assistant to acclaimed talent agent Ed Limato.

In 1990, he co-founded More Medavoy Management with his partner Erwin More.  The company grew quickly, managing Bill Bellamy, Jason Biggs, Bon Jovi, Mariah Carey, Morris Chestnut, Jenna Elfman, Jimmy Fallon, Melissa Gilbert, Mariska Hargitay, Lucy Lawless, Howie Long, Marlee Matlin, Jenny McCarthy, Patrick Swayze, Cicely Tyson, Maria Bello, Kristen Bell, Jason Bateman, Josh Brolin, Ryan Reynolds, Tobey Maguire, Peter Berg among others during operation.

From 1994 until 2002, Brian Medavoy received producer credits on a slew of television movies and series including Sweet Justice, The Single Guy, Since You've Been Gone, Getting Personal, Ringmaster, American High, Dharma & Greg and Just Shoot Me!.  In 1999, More Medavoy Management merged with Susan Bymell and Evelyn O'Neill becoming the Talent Entertainment Group.  It was while working at Talent Entertainment Group that Brian Medavoy received an Emmy for his work on American High.

After a hiatus, Medavoy and Erwin More joined forces again in 2014 with a client roster that included Paula Patton, Neal McDonough, Bella Heathcote, Kristoffer Polaha, Reno Wilson, Michael Beach, Ben Koldyke and Eric Balfour.

Filmography

References

External links

Official Website
Official Tubefilter Article

Place of birth missing (living people)
1965 births
Living people
American people of Ukrainian-Jewish descent
American television producers
Talent agents
Medavoy family